

History
The cooperation between Rheinmetall and Ferrostaal proven for several years in Algeria., the defence companies from Düsseldorf founded in Algeria in March 2011, together with Ferrostaal and government partners Rheinmetall Algeria SPA. in Ain Smara near Constantine Algeria, composed of three main shareholders, namely the Company of the development in the automotive industry (EDIV) coming under the National Defence Ministry (51%) The second shareholder is represented by the Emirati investment fund "Aabar" (24,5%), Ferrostaal (19,5%)  Rheinmetall is considered as the technological partner (5%).

The company's goal: building a production facility for the manufacture of armoured transport vehicle type Fuchs. The production of the first armoured personnel start From 2015 within ten years up to a total of 1,200 important key components, which require much more expertise to be imported from Germany.

Models
Fuchs II 6×6, the Algerian Fuchs will be equipped with engines manufactured by MTU in Oued Hmimine Constantine.
Boxer 8×8, Algeria has been interested in Boxer since 2015 just after the launch of the production of Fuch 2. In 2015, the ANP ( Armée Nationale Populaire) received a test copy that will make the parade on January 31, 2018, under the eyes of the Algerian CHOD Algeria could reach 500 units by 2023,the Algerian Boxers will be equipped same as the previous Fuchs with engines manufactured by MTU in Oued Hmimine Constantine.
 Gladius 2.0 (IdZ-ES) Future Soldier – Extended System and Argus, both modular systems that reduce the burden on the foot soldier while enhancing overall capability

References

External links
 http://www.facing-finance.org/en/database/cases/rheinmetall-manufacturing-of-armored-vehicles-in-algeria/

Companies based in Constantine, Algeria
Defence companies of Algeria
Engineering companies of Algeria
Truck manufacturers of Algeria
Companies established in 2011
2011 establishments in Algeria
Algeria–Germany relations